National Route 441 is a national highway of Japan connecting Ōzu, Ehime and Shimanto, Kōchi in Japan, with a total length of 110.9 km (68.91 mi).

References

National highways in Japan
Roads in Ehime Prefecture
Roads in Kōchi Prefecture